Câmpulung, also spelled Cîmpulung, can refer to these places in Romania:

Câmpulung or Câmpulung Muscel, a town in Argeș County
Câmpulung Moldovenesc, a town in Suceava County
Câmpulung la Tisa, a commune in Maramureș County
Câmpulung County, a former administrative subdivision of Romania

See also 
 Câmpia (disambiguation)
 Câmpeni (disambiguation)
 Câmpu River (disambiguation)
 Câmpu Mare (disambiguation)